The 1998 Rutgers Scarlet Knights football team represented Rutgers University in the 1998 NCAA Division I-A football season. In their third season under head coach Terry Shea, the Scarlet Knights compiled a 5–6 record, were outscored by opponents 376 to 206, and finished in sixth place in the Big East Conference. The team's statistical leaders included Mike McMahon with 2,203 passing yards, Jacki Crooks with 821 rushing yards, and Bill Powell with 730 receiving yards.

Schedule

References

Rutgers
Rutgers Scarlet Knights football seasons
Rutgers Scarlet Knights football